The Hague Conference on Reparations 1929-30 - International Conference on Reparations, which reviewed and adopted the Young Plan; was held in The Hague from August 6 to August 31, 1929 and from January 3 to January 20, 1930.

Course 

Belgium, Great Britain, Germany, Greece, Italy, Second Polish Republic, Portugal, Romania, France, Czechoslovakia, Yugoslavia and Japan were represented at the 2nd session of the Hague Conference on Reparations (August 6-31, 1929). The US officially did not participate in the conference; however, initiating the Young Plan, put pressure on the participants of the conference, seeking to make this plan.

At the Hague Conference on Reparations, the struggle between the United Kingdom and France began around three issues: the distribution of so-called unconditional, that is, not proper deferment, part of the reparations; supply in kind (Britain demanded a reduction in their favor in increasing their exports, especially coal); the percentage distribution of the total amount of reparations between the creditors.

Results 
As a result of behind-the-scenes negotiations between the main participants of the conference on August 31, 1929, a protocol was signed on the principle approval of the Young plan. The final approval of the Young plan, as well as the adoption of a decision to impose sanctions in the event of Germany's refusal to pay reparations, took place at the 2nd session of the conference (3-20 January 1930), where, in addition to the States parties to the first session, Austria, Bulgaria and Hungary.

One of the main decisions of the conference was also the agreement on early retirement (5 years before the date fixed by the Versailles Peace Treaty of 1919) of all occupying forces from the Rhineland (no later than 30 June 1930).

Literature 
 Anglo-American Relations in the 1920s: The Struggle for Supremacy, B. J. C. McKercher, 1991
 The End of the European Era: 1890 to the Present, Gilbert & Large, 2002
 1929, The Year of the Great Crash, William K. Klingaman, 1989

International conferences in the Netherlands
Events in The Hague
Diplomatic conferences in the Netherlands
1929 in the Netherlands